Monterrey is a district of the San Carlos canton, in the Alajuela province of Costa Rica.

History 
Monterrey was created on 16 April 1979 by Decreto Ejecutivo 10003-G. Segregated from Venado.

Geography 

Location 
It is located in the northern region of the country and borders with Pocosol to the north, La Fortuna and Tilarán to the south, La Fortuna and Cutris to the east and Venado to the west.

Its head, the town of Monterrey, is located 50.6 km (1 hour 2 minutes) to the NW of Ciudad Quesada and 142 km (2 hours 47 minutes) to the NW of San Jose the capital of the nation.

Demographics 

For the 2011 census, Monterrey had a population of  inhabitants.

Transportation

Road transportation 
The district is covered by the following road routes:
 National Route 4
 National Route 752

Settlements 
Monterrey has 17 population centers:
Santo Domingo
Mirador
Santa Marta
Montelimar
San Andrés
San Cristóbal
La Unión
San Antonio
Pataste
Sabalito
San Miguel
San Juan
Las Delicias
Chambacú
La Orquídea
Alto de Monterrey
San Eulalia

Economy 

The district is characterized by a fresh climate, mountains and evergreen grasslands that together with the wealth and abundance of water, allows the development of meat and milk breeding, as well as planting roots and tubers.

References 

Districts of Alajuela Province
Populated places in Alajuela Province